The 2022 Copper X-Prix (formally the 2022 Antofagasta Minerals Copper X-Prix) was an Extreme E off-road race that was held on 24 and 25 September 2022 in the small mining city of Calama, in the Atacama Desert in the Chilean region of Antofagasta. It was the fourth round of the electric off-road racing car series' second season, and also marked not only the first running of the event, but also the first time the series visited South America, after planned trips to Brazil and Argentina were cancelled in 2021. The final was won by Sébastien Loeb and Cristina Gutiérrez for X44 Vida Carbon Racing after a penalty for on-track winners Neom McLaren Extreme E. Acciona  Sainz XE Team and Abt Cupra XE rounded out the podium.

Classification

Qualifying

Notes:
 Tie-breakers were determined by Super Sector times.

Semi-final 1

Semi-final 2

Crazy Race

Final

Notes:
  – Rosberg X Racing qualified for the final by virtue of winning semi-final 1, but technical issues meant they could not start the race. According to the sporting regulations, GMC Hummer EV Chip Ganassi Racing, who were first reserves, took their place on the grid. As such, Rosberg X Racing were recognised as sixth-place finishers, while Chip Ganassi Racing would score points based on their position in the final.
  – Team awarded 5 additional points for being fastest in the Super Sector.
  – Neom McLaren Extreme E finished first on the road, but received a pair of 10-second time penalties for dropping two waypoint flags that relegated them to last place. GMC Hummer EV Chip Ganassi Racing originally finished third and were briefly up to second due to McLaren's penalty, but later received a 5-second time penalty themselves for missing a waypoint.

References

External links
 

|- style="text-align:center"
|width="35%"|Previous race:2022 Island X-Prix
|width="30%"|Extreme E Championship2022 season
|width="35%"|Next race:2022 Energy X-Prix
|- style="text-align:center"
|width="35%"|Previous race:N/A
|width="30%"|Copper X-Prix
|width="35%"|Next race:N/A
|- style="text-align:center"

Copper X-Prix
Motorsport competitions in Chile
Sport in Antofagasta Region
Copper X-Prix
Copper X-Prix